The Little Knife River (East) is a  river in Lake County, Minnesota, United States. It is a tributary of the Knife River, located northwest of the city of Two Harbors. A second Little Knife River flows into the Knife River from the west, through St. Louis County.

See also
List of rivers of Minnesota

References

Minnesota Watersheds
USGS Hydrologic Unit Map - State of Minnesota (1974)

Rivers of Minnesota
Rivers of Lake County, Minnesota
Tributaries of Lake Superior